Pseudozeuzera stenlii is a moth in the family Cossidae. It was described by Yakovlev in 2009. It is found in the Democratic Republic of Congo.

References

Natural History Museum Lepidoptera generic names catalog

Zeuzerinae
Moths described in 2009